Adrian Vlastelica is an Australian footballer currently playing for Sydney United 58 in the NPL NSW.

Career
Vlastelica started his career at Apia Leichhardt Tigers playing in 2015 the NSW National Premier League. He was part of the 2017 Apia Leichhardt premiership  winning side, before transferring to Sydney United in 2018 . He skippered the club throughout the 2022 Australia Cup helping Sydney United become the first National Premier Leagues club to reach the cup final against Macarthur FC, beating other A-League opposition Western United and Brisbane Roar in the process, having started their cup run in the Fourth Round of qualification.

On November 4, 2022 Vlastelica signed his first professional contract with A-League club Sydney FC on a short-term, 3-month injury replacement contract after Alex Wilkinson was substituted off in the opening round of the 2022-23 A-League Men season with a long-term groin injury. He made his debut for Sydney in a 3–1 defeat to Brisbane Roar at Moreton Bay Stadium.

References

External links
 

Living people
Australian soccer players
Association football midfielders
Sydney FC players
National Premier Leagues players
A-League Men players
1995 births
Australian people of Croatian descent